Phylloporus alborufus is a species of fungus in the family Boletaceae. It was first described as a new species in 2010.

References

External links

alborufus
Fungi described in 2010